Irakli I. Kiziriia/Kiziriya was a Georgian /Soviet rugby union player, who played for the national team. He was a Soviet Master of Sport.

References
 Sorokin, A.A. (А. А. Сорокин) "Rugby" (Регби) in English translation of Great Soviet Encyclopedia (Progress Publishers, Moscow, 1978)
 Russian text available at  Большая советская энциклопедия: Регби

External links
 Турниры СССР по регби 1967

Year of birth missing
Year of death missing
Soviet rugby union players
Rugby union players from Georgia (country)
Honoured Masters of Sport of the USSR